"Martin & Gina" is a song by American rapper Polo G from his second studio album The Goat (2020). It was released as the album's fifth single and its music video was released on August 13, 2021
. In the song, Polo G compares his relationship with a girl to that of Martin Payne and Gina Waters in the sitcom Martin, and talks about how it has improved despite clashes.

Music video
The music video was directed by the Reel Goats and pays tribute to Martin. Polo G plays the titular character, while Gina is played by comedian and rapper Pretty Vee. Polo reproduces scenes from Martin with Vee.

Live performances
On September 21, 2020, Polo G performed the song on The Tonight Show Starring Jimmy Fallon.

Charts

Weekly charts

Year-end charts

Certifications

References

2020 singles
2020 songs
Polo G songs
Columbia Records singles
Songs written by Polo G